The Battle of Versa took place on the 26 July 1866 during the Third Italian War of Independence in the Italian unification process.

The Italian army, jointly commanded by Alberto La Forest de Divonne, defeated the Austrian army guarding the crossing of the Torre river at Ponte di Versa, present-day fraction of Romans d'Isonzo in the province of Gorizia. This marked the maximum Italian advance into Friuli.

Order of Battle
Austrian Army:
Two squadrons of the Württemberg Hussar Regiment (300 men)
18 companies of the Regiments "Archduke L. Vittore", "Nagy", "Grand Duke of Tuscany" (2,500 men)
 7th Artillery Regiment (2 pieces)
Italian Army:
Five cavalry squadrons of the 9th Regiment "Lancieri di Firenze" (400 men)
Fourteen companies of the 10th, 16th, 22nd and 35th Bersaglieri Battalion (1,600 men)
5th Battery of the 8th Artillery Regiment (6 pieces)

Battle
The battle took place after noon and continued until 14:00 on the wooden bridge over the Torre river, between the Italian army arriving from Palmanova, as the vanguard of Cialdini's expedition, and the Austrian troops encamped on the bank left of the Torre torrent.

After the war, 38 Italian soldiers were awarded, and the Regiment Lancieri di Firenze received the bronze medal for military valor.

In 2016, some graves of the soldiers who fell during the battle were found in the bed of the Torre.

See also
Italian unification
Regiment "Lancieri di Firenze" (9th)
Torre

References

Bibliography 

Versa
Versa 1866
Versa 1866
Versa
1866 in Italy
1866 in the Austrian Empire
June 1866 events